Aphileta is a genus of dwarf spiders that was first described by J. E. Hull in 1920.  it contains only three species in the United States and Canada: A. centrasiatica, A. microtarsa, and A. misera.

See also
 List of Linyphiidae species

References

Araneomorphae genera
Holarctic spiders
Linyphiidae
Spiders of Asia
Spiders of the United States